Ripponpeté is a small town located in Hosanagara Taluk, Shivamogga district, Karnataka, India.and it is center point of four taluks they are Shimoga sagara thirtahalli and hosanagra, the town is a gateway to the Malenadu (Malnad) region of India.

See also
Kunchikal Falls
Varahi River
Agumbe

References

External links
Ripponpet on Wikimapia

Cities and towns in Shimoga district